Bharath Dharma Jana Sena (BDJS) is a political party in India. Thushar Vellappally is the current national president of BDJS. BDJS is a constituent of National Democratic Alliance in Kerala.

BDJS was formed in December 2015.

BDJS is the political wing of SNDP Yogam. In 1976, the SNDP had formed the Socialist Republican Party (SRP) which won two seats in the 1982 Kerala Legislative Assembly election but soon faded into oblivion due to internal issues.

In February 2021, BDJS split and a faction under the leadership of M. K. Neelakandan Master declared a new political party, Bharathiya Jana Sena (BJS).

Electoral performance
In the 2016 Kerala Legislative Assembly election, BDJS was part of National Democratic Alliance and contested in 37 seats (out of 140) but won none. In the 2019 Lok Sabha election in Kerala, BDJS contested in 4 seats (out of 20) and won none. Party president Thushar Vellapally contested in Wayanad and lost by a huge margin against Rahul Gandhi.

References

https://timesofindia.indiatimes.com/city/kozhikode/bdjs-president-thushar-vellapally-says-subash-vasu-cheated-party/articleshow/73275343.cms
https://www.ndtv.com/india-news/lok-sabha-election-2019-thushar-vellappally-bjp-ally-will-face-rahul-gandhi-in-wayanad-2015983

Political parties in Kerala
2015 establishments in Kerala
Member parties of the National Democratic Alliance
Political parties established in 2015
State political parties in Kerala